MRadio 106.9 (DXPB 106.9 MHz) is an FM station owned and operated by the Municipal Government of Molave. Its studios and transmitter are located at Molave Gym, Rizal Ave., Brgy. Madasigon, Molave, Zamboanga del Sur.

References

External links
Radyo Pilipinas Molave FB Page

Radio stations in Zamboanga del Sur
Radio stations established in 2012